Isabella Jedrzejczyk (born 1953 London) is a British photographer. She was a member of the  Amber Film & Photography Collective.

She studied at Nottingham Trent University. In the 1980s, she was commissioned to document Druridge Bay.

Exhibitions 

 Urban Landscapes 1979 
 Jungle Portraits 1981 
 Idea of North 2018

Works

References

External links 
 Izabela Jedrzejczyk discusses her new exhibition of the Jungle Portraits Flow Photographic Gallery, 30 September 2021

1953 births
British photographers
Living people